The Lieutenant Governor of Jersey (Jèrriais: Gouvèrneux d'Jèrri) is the representative of the British monarch in the Bailiwick of Jersey, a Crown dependency of the British Crown.

The Lieutenant Governor has his own flag in Jersey, the Union Flag defaced with the Bailiwick's coat of arms. The Lieutenant Governor's official residence (Government House) in St. Saviour was depicted on the Jersey £50 note 1989–2010.

Duties

The duties are primarily diplomatic and ceremonial. The role of the Lieutenant Governor is to act as the de facto head of state  in Jersey. The Lieutenant Governor also liaises between the Governments of Jersey and the United Kingdom. The holder of this office is also ex officio a member of the States of Jersey but may not vote and, by convention, speaks in the Chamber only on appointment and on departure from post.

The Lieutenant Governor exercises certain executive functions relating broadly to citizenship (passports, deportation and nationality). Jersey passports are British passports issued on behalf of the Lieutenant Governor, in the exercise of the royal prerogative, through the Passport Office which the States fund and from which the States retain any revenue generated. Deportation from Jersey is ordered by the Lieutenant Governor. Certificates of naturalization as a British citizen are issued by the Lieutenant Governor.

History

The office of Lieutenant Governor has its origins in the Norman administration of the Channel Islands. The functions of the bailiff and the official who was later to become known as Lieutenant Governor (called variously, Warden or Captain) became separate in the aftermath of the division of Normandy in 1204. However, the respective responsibilities of the two officials were only clearly defined in the 17th century as a result of a power struggle between bailiff and governor. An Order in Council dated 18 February 1617 laid down that "the charge of military forces be wholly in the Governor, and the care of justice and civil affairs in the Bailiff"

When the monarchy was restored, King Charles II who had escaped to Jersey on his way to exile in France rewarded Jersey with the power to levy customs duties. This power, exercised by the Assembly of Governor, Bailiff and Jurats, was finally taken over by the States of Jersey in 1921, thereby enabling the States to control the budget independently of the Lieutenant Governor.

The post of Governor of Jersey became a titular sinecure, and a Lieutenant Governor was appointed to actually carry out the functions of the office. William Beresford, 1st Viscount Beresford, was the last titular Governor of Jersey; since his death in 1856 the Crown has been formally and constitutionally represented in Jersey by the Lieutenant Governor.

The States of Jersey Law 2005 abolished any power of the Lieutenant Governor to veto a resolution of the States.

In 2010, it was announced that the next Lieutenant Governor would be recommended to the Crown by a Jersey panel, thus replacing the previous system of the appointment being made by the Crown on the recommendation of UK ministers.

List of governors of Jersey

Governors have been:

List of lieutenant governors of Jersey

Lieutenant Governors of Jersey have been:

See also

 List of Bailiffs of Jersey

References

External links 
 

 
Jersey-related lists
1502 establishments in Europe